KBEN (1450 AM) is a radio station broadcasting a country music format. Licensed to Carrizo Springs, Texas, United States, the station serves the Eagle Pass area. The station is currently owned by Sylvia Mijares.

References

External links

BEN
Country radio stations in the United States
Radio stations established in 1983